Sideroxylon majus is a long-lived tree in the family Sapotaceae, endemic to Réunion.

See also
 Sideroxylon grandiflorum, the dodo tree, a species native to Mauritius, that has been confounded with Sideroxylon majus (particularly its synonym Calvaria major)

References

majus
Trees of Africa
Taxa named by Charles Baehni
Taxa named by Karl Friedrich von Gaertner